Beau Brady (born 11 October 1981) is an Australian actor from Sydney, Australia.

Biography 
Brady attended high school at Oak Hill College where he took up Drama in year eight. In 1999 he debuted in the acting world by guest starring on the hit show "Breakers". Soon after finishing high school in 2000 and studying Film and TV at Sydney University he landed the role and became a regular cast member of the hit TV show "Home and Away" spanning him a 4-year career and bringing him 4 Logie nominations for best actor.

Moving to Los Angeles and after studying acting at "The Acting Corps" in Los Angeles he returned to Australia in 2007 to appear alongside Stephen Curry in the Tele Movie "The King" (The Graham Kennedy Story). Brady's acting career has spanned across many years with other notable roles in Film and TV including "Voodoo Lagoon", "The Bill “(U.K.), "Wonderland", "Secret City", "Hyde and Seek" and the up-and-coming TV Series "We Were Tomorrow".

Filmography

References

External links

Australian male film actors
Australian male soap opera actors
Australian male stage actors
1981 births
Living people
Male actors from Sydney